R. K. Damodaran (Malayalam: ആർ കെ ദാമോദരൻ) (born on 1 August 1953) is a poet and lyricist who has worked predominantly in the Malayalam movie industry. He also worked as a journalist in Mathrubhumi from 1982 to 2013. He has written lyrics for almost 3,600 songs in devotional, political, environmental, drama and light music genres, including two Sanskrit songs. He has worked in more than 100 Malayalam films and written songs like "Ravivarma Chithrathin", "Thalam Thettiya Tharatt", "Manjil Chekkerum", "Sukham", "Chandrakiranathin Chandanamunnum", "Thani Thankakkinapponkal" and "Pakalppoove".

Career 
Damodaran, from Manjapra in Palakkad district, studied BA Malayalam at [[Maharajas College, Kochi]] and Sanskrit language at Bharatiya Vidya Bhavan, Kochi. He entered the film music world in 1977, when he was a second year BA student at Maharaja's College. His first song was "Ravivarma Chithrathin Rathi Bhavame" for the 1978 movie Raju Rahim (recorded on 2 November 1977 at AVM-C Theatre, Chennai). He soon made a name for himself in the Malayalam movie industry. During a career spanning over four decades, he has written 118 film songs and worked with music masters like Dakshinamurthy, Devarajan Master, M. S. Viswanathan, Ilayaraja, Arjunan Master, Johnson, Raveendran, Syam,  S. P. Venkitesh, Jerry Amaldev, Perumbavoor G. Raveendranath, Vidyadharan, Mohan Sithara, T. S. Radhakrishnan, Vidya Sagar, K.P. Udayabhanu, M. Jayachandran, Deepak Dev and Berny-Ignatious. The film Cleopatra, released in 2013, ws his last film.

Besides writing lyrics for Malayalam movies, he also published four books. Two were collection of his poetry, Athunathanam and Kadharaavaneeyam. The other two were devotional song collections namely Amme Narayana and Aravana Madhuram. He also wrote two dramas, Poorapparambu and Kannakiyude Mula. He has also learned to play the chenda, Kerala's traditional percussion instrument, from Babu Kanjilasseri of Kozhikode.

Damodaran was selected as a member of the Kerala Sangeetha Nataka Academy during 2001 to 2004 which is run by the government of Kerala. Since 2012, he has been an executive member of Bharat Bhavan which is under the Department of Culture, government of Kerala. He has been an executive member of Samastha Kerala Sahithya Parishad since 2016.

Personal life 
RK Damodaran was born to Manjapra Kothanath Chirayil Kalathil Ramankutty Nair and Palakkad Pallatheri Kappadathu Puthanveettil Kalyani Kutti Amma on 1 August 1953 in Kochi. He is deeply influenced by the fertile cultural landscape of his family place. He married Rajalakshmy (a native of North Paravoor), who was his classmate at Maharaja's College, on 7 June 1985. They have a daughter named Anagha (b. 1986). They are currently residing at Kochi, Kerala.

Awards 
These are some of the awards and achievements in the career life of R. K. Damodaran.
 Kerala Sangeetha Nataka Academy Kalasree Award - 2013
 Kunjunni Master Award for poetry - 2008
 Vaadya Mithra Award with Suvarna Mudra - 2006
 Kesava Poduval Smaraka Puraskaram - 2018
 Pavakulathamma Award -2018
 P.Gokulapalan Sankam Kala Group Award -2017
 Thirumantham Kunnu Neerajanam Award- 2014
 Parasseri Meen Kulathi Bhagavathi Temple’s Bhadrapriya Award - 2014
 Paloor Sree Subrahmanya Swami Temple Award - 2014
 Akhila Bharathiya Ayappa Samithi Award - 2014
 Pattambi Sreethali Mahadeva Puraskaram- 2013
 Oottoor Unni Namboothirippadu Smaraka Puraskaram- 2011
 Kashypa Veda Research Foundation Award - 2010
 Mayilppeeli Award from Guruvayoor - 2010
 Thathvamasi Award - 2010
 Pambadi Pambumkavu Sree Nagaraja Puraskaram - 2009
 Jaycey Foundation Award - 2005
 Kerala Film Audience Council Award - 2004 & 2005
 Sangam Kala Group Award - 2003
 MTV Award and Smrithi Award - 2002
 Harivarasanam Award - 2001
 Drisya Award - 2000, 2002, 2004 & 2007
 Malayalam Tele Viewers Association Award - 2000
 Ayyappa Ganasree Award - 1994
 IPTA Award for the Best National Integration Song - 1992
 Nana Miniscreen Award - 1991
 Chottanikkara narayana Marar memorial NAVA NAARAAYAM award-2018

References

External links 
 R K Damodaran famous movie songs, Filmibeat
 40 Years of R K Damodaran, Deccan Chronicle
 Kerala Sangeetha Nataka Akademi Awards, The Hindu

1953 births
Living people
Indian male poets
Maharaja's College, Mysore alumni
Malayalam poets
People from Kochi
Recipients of the Kerala Sangeetha Nataka Akademi Award